is a Japanese equestrian. He competed in the individual jumping event at the 2008 Summer Olympics.

References

External links
 

1986 births
Living people
Japanese male equestrians
Olympic equestrians of Japan
Equestrians at the 2008 Summer Olympics
Sportspeople from Nagano Prefecture
Equestrians at the 2020 Summer Olympics